The Taoni is a Rajput ethnic group who, dominated a region in Ambala district then a part of the Punjab until the period of the Mughal Empire. They are an offshoot of Bhati Rajputs of Jaisalmer State.

See also
 List of Rajputs

References

Rajput clans of Haryana